The Hawaiian archipelago consists of 137 islands in the Pacific Ocean that are far from any other land. Polynesians arrived there one to two thousand years ago, and in 1778 Captain James Cook and his crew became the first Europeans to visit Hawaii (which they called the Sandwich Islands). The art created in these islands may be divided into art existing prior to Cook’s arrival; art produced by recently arrived westerners; and art produced by Hawaiians incorporating western materials and ideas. Public collections of Hawaiian art may be found at the Honolulu Museum of Art, the Bishop Museum (Honolulu), the Hawaii State Art Museum and the University of Göttingen in Germany.

In 1967, Hawaii became the first state in the nation to implement a Percent for Art law. The Art in State Buildings Law established the Art in Public Places Program and designated one percent of the construction costs of new public schools and state buildings for the acquisition of works of art, either by commission or by purchase.

Art prior to Cook's arrival

Art existing prior to Cook’s arrival is very similar to the art of other Pacific Islanders. This art includes wood carvings, feather work, petroglyphs, bark cloth (called kapa in Hawaiian and tapa elsewhere in the Pacific) and tattoos. Native Hawaiians had neither metal nor woven cloth. Production of this art continued after Cook’s arrival. A few craftsmen still produce traditional Hawaiian arts, either to sell to tourists or to preserve native culture.

Art produced by visitors

Some of the first westerners to visit Hawaii were artists—both professional and amateur. Many of the explorers’ ships had professional artists to record their discoveries. These artists sketched and painted Hawaii’s people and landscapes using imported materials and concepts. Artists in this category include Alfred Thomas Agate (American 1812-1849), Mabel Alvarez (American 1891-1985), Auguste Borget (French 1809-1877), George Henry Burgess (English 1831-1905), Jean Charlot (French 1898-1979), Nicholas Chevalier (1828-1902), Louis Choris (German–Ukrainian 1795-1828), Ernest William Christmas (Australian 1863- 1918), Amelia R. Coats (American), Constance Fredericka Gordon Cumming (Scottish 1837-1924), Robert Dampier (English 1800-1874), Stanislas-Henri-Benoit Darondeau (French (1807-1841), John La Farge (American 1835-1910), Ejler Andreas Jorgensen (Danish 1838-1876), Georgia O'Keeffe (American 1887-1986), Roi George Partridge (American 1888-1984), Ambrose McCarthy Patterson (Australian 1877-1967), Enoch Wood Perry, Jr. (American 1831-1915), James Gay Sawkins (British 1806-1878), Eduardo Lefebvre Scovell (English 1864-1918), Joseph Henry Sharp (American 1859-1953), John Mix Stanley (American 1814-1872), Joseph Dwight Strong (American 1852-1899), Augustus Vincent Tack (American 1870-1949), Adrien Taunay the younger (French 1803-1828), Jules Tavernier (French 1844-1889), William Pinkney Toler (American 1826-1899), Hubert Vos (Dutch 1855-1935), Lionel Walden (American 1861-1933), John Webber (Swiss-English 1752-1793) and Theodore Wores (American 1859-1939). Night scenes of erupting volcanoes were especially popular, giving rise to The Volcano School.

Art produced by Hawaiians and long-term residents

Artworks produced by Hawaii’s native born and long-term residents incorporating western materials and ideas include paintings on canvas and quilts. They may be distinctly Hawaiian in subject matter or as diverse as their places of origin. Most of the art currently produced in Hawaii falls into this third category. Notable artists in this category include sculptor Satoru Abe (born Hawaii 1926-), woodcarver Fritz Abplanalp (born Switzerland 1907-1982), sculptor Bumpei Akaji (born Hawaii 1921-2002), Charles W. Bartlett (born San Francisco 1860-1940), sculptor Marguerite Louis Blasingame (born Hawaii 1906-1947), sculptor Edward M. Brownlee (born Oregon 1929-), Isami Doi (born Hawaii 1903-1965), Paul Emmert (born Switzerland 1826-1867), Robert Lee Eskridge (born Pennsylvania 1891-1975), ceramicist Sally Fletcher-Murchison (born Hawaii 1933-), Cornelia MacIntyre Foley (born Hawaii 1909-), Juliette May Fraser (born Hawaii 1887-1983), Charles Furneaux (born Boston 1835-1913), Hon Chew Hee (born Hawaii 1906-1993), D. Howard Hitchcock (born Hawaii 1861-1943), Ogura Yonesuke Itoh (born Japan 1870-1940), Princess Kaiulani (born Hawaii 1875-1899), Herb Kawainui Kane (born Minnesota 1928-), John Melville Kelly (born California 1877-1962), sculptor Kate Kelly (1882-1964), Keichi Kimura (born Hawaii 1914-1988), Sueko Matsueda Kimura (born Hawaii 1912-), John Ingvard Kjargaard (born Denmark 1902), Alan Leitner (born California 1947-), Huc-Mazelet Luquiens (born Massachusetts 1881-1961), Genevieve Springston Lynch (born Oregon 1891-1960), Alexander Samuel MacLeod (born Canada 1888-1956), Arman Tatéos Manookian (born Constantinople 1904-1931), Joseph Nawahi (born Hawaii 1842-1896), Ben Norris (born California 1910-2006), Brook Kapūkuniahi Parker (born Kahalu‘u, O‘ahu July 31, 1961- ), Louis Pohl (born Cincinnati 1915-1999), Shirley Ximena Hopper Russell (born Los Angeles 1886-1985), sculptor Mamoru Sato (born Texas 1937-), Tadashi Sato (born Hawaii 1954-2005), Lloyd Sexton, Jr. (born Hawaii 1912-1990), Alice Louise Judd Simpich (born Hawaii 1918-2006), ceramicist Toshiko Takaezu (born Hawaii 1922-2011), Reuben Tam (born Hawaii 1916-1991), Masami Teraoka (born Japan 1936-), painter John Paul Thomas (born Alabama 1927-2001), Madge Tennent (born England 1889-1972), William Twigg-Smith (born New Zealand 1883-1950)  John Chin Young (born Hawaii 1909-1997) Sculptor Jerry Vasconcellos (born Hawaii 1948 -), Art Photographer Kim Taylor Reece (1949-)

Selected works of native Hawaiian art

References

 Arkinstall, Patricia Lorraine, A study of bark cloth from Hawaii, Samoa, Tonga and Fiji, An exploration of the regional development of distinctive styles of bark cloth and its relationship to other cultural factors, Ithaca, N.Y., 1966
 Blackburn, Mark, Hawaiiana, Schiffer Publishing, Atglen, PA, 1996, 
 Brigham, William Tufts, Ka hana kapa, making of bark-cloth in Hawaii, Honolulu, Bishop Museum Press, 1911
 Clarke, Joan and Diane Dods, Artists/Hawaii, Honolulu, University of Hawaii Press, 1996
 Congdon-Martin, Douglas, Aloha Spirit, Hawaiian Art and Popular Design, Schiffer Publishing, Atglen, PA, 1998
 Cox, J. Halley and William H. Davenport, Hawaiian Sculpture, University of Hawaii Press, 1988
 Department of Education, State of Hawaii, Artists of Hawaii, Honolulu, Department of Education, State of Hawaii, 1985
 Forbes, David W., Encounters with Paradise, Views of Hawaii and its People, 1778-1941, Honolulu Academy of Arts, 1992
 Forbes, David W., He Makana, The Gertrude Mary Joan Damon Haig Collection of Hawaiian Art, Paintings and Prints, Hawaii State Foundation of Culture and the Arts, 2013
 Forbes, David W., Paintings, Prints, and Drawings of Hawaii From the Sam and Mary Cooke Collection, University of Hawaii Press, 2016, 
 Haar, Francis and Neogy, Prithwish, Artists of Hawaii: Nineteen Painters and Sculptors, University of Hawaii Press, 1974
 Honolulu Academy of Arts, Selected works, Honolulu, Hawaii: Honolulu Academy of Arts, 1990
 Kaeppler, Adrienne Lois, The fabrics of Hawaii (bark cloth), Leigh-on-Sea, F. Lewis, 1975
 Morse, Marcia, Honolulu Printmakers 75th Anniversary: A Tradition of Gift Prints, Honolulu Academy of Arts, 2003, 
 Papanikolas, Theresa and DeSoto Brown, Art Deco Hawai'i, Honolulu, Hawaii: Honolulu Museum of Art, 2014, 
 Radford, Georgia and Warren Radford, Sculpture in the Sun, Hawaii's Art for Open Spaces, University of Hawaii Press, 1978
 Sandulli, Justin M., Troubled Paradise: Madge Tennent at a Hawaiian Crossroads, Durham, NC: Duke University, 2016
 Serrao, Poakalani, The Hawaiian quilt, A spiritual experience, Reflection on its history, heritage, designing, quilting methods and patterns, Honolulu, Mutual Pub., 1997
 Severson, Don R., Finding Paradise, Island Art in Private Collections, University of Hawaii Press, 2002
 Yoshihara, Lisa A., Collective Visions, 1967-1997, An Exhibition Celebrating the 30th Anniversary of the State Foundation on Culture and the Arts, Art in Public Places Program, Presented at the Honolulu Academy of Arts, September 3-October 12, 1997, Honolulu, State Foundation on Culture and the Arts, 1997

External links
 Honolulu Museum of Art
 Bishop Museum
 Kapa Hawaii(The Art of Native Hawaiian Kapa)
 Cook-Foster Collection at University in Göttingen, Germany
 Traditional Hawaiian Tattoos and Arts
 Kapa Connection 
 Hawaii’s Percent for Art law

Hawaii art
Art by country
Art in Hawaii